Elections to Down District Council were held on 30 May 1973 on the same day as the other Northern Irish local government elections. The election used three district electoral areas to elect a total of 20 councillors.

Election results

Districts summary

|- class="unsortable" align="centre"
!rowspan=2 align="left"|Ward
! % 
!Cllrs
! % 
!Cllrs
! %
!Cllrs
! %
!Cllrs
! %
!Cllrs
!rowspan=2|TotalCllrs
|- class="unsortable" align="center"
!colspan=2 bgcolor="" | UUP
!colspan=2 bgcolor="" | SDLP
!colspan=2 bgcolor="" | Alliance
!colspan=2 bgcolor="" | Vanguard
!colspan=2 bgcolor="white"| Others
|-
|align="left"|Area A
|bgcolor="40BFF5"|53.9
|bgcolor="40BFF5"|4
|19.8
|1
|11.5
|1
|12.8
|1
|2.0
|0
|7
|-
|align="left"|Area B
|23.7
|1
|bgcolor="#99FF66"|45.4
|bgcolor="#99FF66"|3
|15.4
|1
|0.0
|0
|15.5
|0
|6
|-
|align="left"|Area C
|36.3
|3
|bgcolor="#99FF66"|41.3
|bgcolor="#99FF66"|4
|10.4
|0
|0.0
|0
|12.0
|0
|7
|- class="unsortable" class="sortbottom" style="background:#C9C9C9"
|align="left"| Total
|38.6
|8
|35.0
|8
|12.3
|2
|4.5
|1
|9.6
|1
|20
|-
|}

Districts results

Area A

1973: 4 x UUP, 1 x SDLP, 1 x Alliance, 1 x Vanguard

Area B

1973: 3 x SDLP, 1 x UUP, 1 x Alliance, 1 x Independent

Area C

1973: 4 x SDLP, 3 x UUP

References

Down District Council elections
Down